Henri Baaij (or Baay; 19 September 1900 – 31 May 1943) was a Dutch footballer who played for HFC Haarlem. He was part of the Netherlands national team, playing two matches in 1921.

Baaij served as a soldaat in the Royal Netherlands East Indies Army during the Second World War. He died aged 42 as a prisoner on the Burma Railway on 31 May 1943 and is buried at Kanchanaburi War Cemetery.

References

External links
 
 

1900 births
1943 deaths
Dutch footballers
Netherlands international footballers
Footballers from Amsterdam
HFC Haarlem players
Royal Netherlands East Indies Army personnel of World War II
Dutch military personnel killed in World War II
Dutch prisoners of war in World War II
World War II prisoners of war held by Japan
Dutch people who died in prison custody
Prisoners who died in Japanese detention
Burma Railway prisoners
Association football defenders